In differential topology, an area of mathematics, the Hirzebruch signature theorem (sometimes called the Hirzebruch index theorem)
is Friedrich Hirzebruch's 1954 result expressing the signature
of a smooth closed oriented manifold by a linear combination of Pontryagin numbers called the
L-genus.
It was used in the proof of the Hirzebruch–Riemann–Roch theorem.

Statement of the theorem
The L-genus is the genus for the multiplicative sequence of polynomials
associated to the characteristic power series

The first two of the resulting L-polynomials are:
 
 

By taking for the  the Pontryagin classes  of the tangent bundle of a 4n dimensional smooth closed oriented
manifold M one obtains the L-classes of M.
(i.e. the signature of the intersection form on the 2nth cohomology group of M):

Sketch of proof of the signature theorem
René Thom had earlier proved that the signature was given by some linear combination of Pontryagin numbers, and Hirzebruch found the exact formula for this linear combination
by introducing the notion of the genus of a multiplicative sequence.

Since the rational oriented cobordism ring  is equal to

the polynomial algebra generated by the oriented cobordism classes
 of the even dimensional complex projective spaces,
it is enough to verify that

for all i.

Generalizations
The signature theorem is a special case of the Atiyah–Singer index theorem for
the signature operator.
The analytic index of the signature operator equals the signature of the manifold, and its topological index is the L-genus of the manifold.
By the Atiyah–Singer index theorem these are equal.

References

Sources

 F. Hirzebruch, The Signature Theorem. Reminiscences and recreation. Prospects in Mathematics, Annals of Mathematical Studies, Band 70, 1971, S. 3–31.

Theorems in algebraic topology
Theorems in differential topology